Li Wenhai (born February 28, 1932) is a Chinese historian and was the President of Renmin University of China.

Biography
Li Wenhai was born in Wuxi, Jiangsu.  He received his graduate degree from Renmin University in 1955.  He was the President of the University from 1994 to 2000.

External links
 Li Wenhai's profile at Renmin University of China's website

1932 births
People's Republic of China historians
Renmin University of China alumni
Presidents of Renmin University of China
Writers from Wuxi
Living people
Historians from Jiangsu
Educators from Wuxi